The  is a series of cabover microvans and kei trucks produced by the Japanese automaker Honda from 1977 to 2021, designed for the Japanese domestic market (JDM).  "Acty" is short for "Activity".

The Acty's primary competitors were the Subaru Sambar, Suzuki Carry/Every, Daihatsu Hijet, Mazda Scrum, Nissan NT100/NV100 Clipper and the Mitsubishi Minicab.

History
The Acty range is designed to be economical, agile work vehicles, and generally lack luxury options, although air conditioning and power steering are available along with various trim, decoration, and customization options. The first generation was produced from 1977 to 1988 (model series TA, TB, TC, VD, VH), the second generation's years were 1988-1999 (model series HA1, HA2, HH1, HH2 with the E05A engine; HA3, HA4, HA5, HH3, HH4 with the EN07A engine - the Street continued in production until 2011) and the third generation's years were 1999-2009 (model series HA6, HA7, HH5, HH6 with E07Z engine) with the van remaining in production until April 2021. The fourth generation was introduced, as a truck only, at the 41st Tokyo Motor Show in 2009 on December 17, showing the HA8 series and continuing to use the E07Z engine. Since the merger of the Subaru Sambar and Daihatsu Hijet, the Acty truck has become the only remaining Kei truck not to have a front-engine, rear-wheel-drive layout.

First generation

The first Acty trucks were introduced July 27, 1977, and replaced several Keitoras Honda had previously offered, such as the Honda TN360 (most recently sold as the TN7) and the Honda T360. On 1 September 1975, the Japanese Government revised the rules on Road Trucking Vehicle Law that regulated the dimensions and engine size of vehicles in this class. This was about 50% larger than the engine used in the preceding TN7. Export models, with less emissions equipment, claim  at the same engine speed.

The van was introduced November 1979, although a truck-based panel van with a boxy rear was available from the beginning (TB). To save money, the van uses the same taillights as the truck and also has side doors with center mounted handles, meaning that the same pressing can be used for either side of the car. The Acty was exported to a number of markets, including Great Britain, where it is considered to have created an entire new category. The Suzuki Carry/Bedford Rascal was GM's response to the Acty in the British market.

An upper trim level of the Acty van intended mainly for passenger usage went on sale 1 February 1981 and was called the Honda Street ; it was produced for two generations of the Acty van. Available with a standard or an all-new high roof design, the high roof was also made available for the Acty van (SDX only). The name was discontinued in 2001 after the Honda Vamos name had been reintroduced as a replacement trim level for the Street, on a shared platform of the Acty van. In March 1983 the four-wheel drive Acty/Street was added. This was also the first Acty/Street to receive a five-speed manual gearbox, initially only available on the 4WD models. A larger,  was also part of the 4WD's equipment.

In June 1982 the series received a facelift, with wraparound turn signals. While the Acty has round headlamps, the Street received square units after the facelift. Starting with model year 1985, the Acty/Street was exclusive to a chain of Japanese Honda dealerships established for small and commercial vehicles, called Honda Primo.

Export versions
The first generation Acty was also sold in a few export markets, such as the United Kingdom and Australia. Subsequent models were marketed almost entirely in the Japanese domestic market only. As a bit of an oddity, the Acty was sold during 1982 in Australia, but was made unavailable inside of Sydney due to concerns by Honda that the vehicle was underpowered for the hilly terrain.

Second generation

The second generation Acty was launched in May 1988 with the introduction of the Honda E05 engine, with an additional cylinder added, making it a 547 cc 3-cylinder with SOHC. The first models were the Acty truck and van, with the commercial grade Acty van appearing a month later. The 4WD models (HA2, HA4 after the 1990 facelift) were no longer available with an automatic transmission. There was also an "Acty Attack" version of the truck, intended for farmers in particular this model has a differential lock in the rear and features Ultra-Low forward and reverse gears (UL/UR). The other models of STD, SDX, SDX2 and TOWN had slight variations with the TOWN and SDX2 adding a color coded (white) bumper and side mirrors along with a tachometer. The TOWN features tweed seats with a brown interior (as opposed to "vinyl" like seats on STD models). The only other notable options were a light for rear work area and radio.

The original Actys have distinct round headlights (known as “round-eye”) while the Street Van has large, rectangular headlamps. At this time the Street also received the taillights from the contemporary Honda Today (which were also used for the third generation Acty van). The 1990 changeover also meant that the 547 cc engine was replaced with the larger 656 cc Honda E07A engine (with fuel injection added in 1996). Trucks received the HA3/HA4 chassis numbers depending on whether they are two- or four-wheel drive, while vans/Streets are called HH3/HH4. 

In October 1993, the Honda Street and Acty's front design was changed yet again, receiving larger, more square headlamp units with one chamfered corner. A PGM-FI version in "Fox" and "Xi" equipment levels was also introduced to the Street at this time. This version produces . The front end changes were applied to the Acty as well, beginning in January 1994. The Acty Crawler (HA5), with treads mounted on tandem axles replacing the rear wheels, was released in January 1994 and remained in production for special order until 1999. The Acty and the Street were further modified in January 1996 when the front turn signals were changed from amber to clear. At this time, the fuel injected Acty SDX-Hi was also introduced - only with two-wheel drive and a five-speed manual - with the same engine as the Street Xi (the Fox was dropped, replaced by the carburetted Street V). Production of the Acty continued until the arrival of the third generation in 1999, although the Honda Street continued to be built until 2001 as it was only partially replaced by the pricier Honda Vamos.

Third generation

The third generation Acty truck was introduced on 27 May 1999. The van went on sale one month later. On September 30, 1996, the Japanese Government amended the Enforcement Regulations Vehicle Law, Ministerial Ordinance No. 53, which addressed safety requirements for front passengers, but did not allow for larger overall dimensions. Honda pushed the driving position back while keeping the engine in its traditional location underneath the vehicle. The new design retained the mid-engined, rear-wheel-drive layout although it was now of a "semi-bonneted" design. Meeting the increased safety requirements was a major focus during development. The base price of the pickup model is ¥777,000 (approximately $7,920 USD), with the van starting at ¥1,060,500 (approximately US$10,810) as of December 2008. Four-wheel drive is available as an option on all vans, and all but one model of pickup truck, making the Acty one of a handful of mid-engine, AWD vehicles that are not designed as supercars.

The 656 cc engine is of an LEV design, with low emissions and high gas mileage. Fuel economy was further increased by the use of electric power steering. The truck was available as a basic standard model, SDX (Super Deluxe) and more comfortable Town versions. There was also the Acty Attack, a spartanly equipped four-wheel drive version with a differential lock, particularly intended for farmers. The van was available as a two-seater Pro-B (with division) or as the somewhat more comfortable Pro-A. There were also four-seater SDX and Town versions. The Acty van (and the related Vamos Hobio) kept using the taillights of the 1988 facelift version of the Honda Today.

The "Street" name was discontinued in favor of the Honda Vamos, based on the Acty van. In December 2009, the Acty truck was replaced by the new fourth generation model, but the bonneted Acty van continued to be produced with the third generation bodywork. On 12 July 2018, the Acty van was discontinued and it was replaced by the N-Van.

Fourth generation (truck)

On 17 December 2009, the fourth generation Acty truck was introduced. As for the Daihatsu Hijet and Suzuki Carry competitors, this model has become delinked from the van as a result of differing safety requirements for commercial vehicles and passenger-type vans. The chassis codes are HA8 (2WD) or HA9 (4WD). In June 2012, the Acty underwent some light modifications so as to meet new upcoming standards on lighting.

In November 2018, Honda renewed the "Spirit Color Style", a special-purpose vehicle commemorating the 55th anniversary of T360, the origin of Honda's four-wheeled vehicle, based on the "TOWN" type, in the light commercial vehicle "ACTY TRUCK" released on November 9.

Discontinuation
The Acty ended production in April 2021 due to new emissions regulations and mandatory crash mitigation brakes that will be gradually required to be installed, thus increasing development costs.

References

External links 

Honda Acty Truck webpage
Honda Acty Van webpage
ThisOldHonda.org Acty
Honda Acty Engine Swap Basics
Honda Acty Talk and Information

Acty
Microvans
Rear mid-engine, rear-wheel-drive vehicles
All-wheel-drive vehicles
Pickup trucks
Vans
Vehicles introduced in 1977
Kei trucks
Cab over vehicles